Best Life may refer to:

 Best Life (magazine), a luxury service magazine for men
 "Best Life" (song), a song by Cardi B
 "Best Life", a song by Allday from Starry Night Over the Phone
 "Best Life", a song by Hardy Caprio
 Best Life, a food brand of Boulder Brands
 Best Life, a 2021 album by French rapper Naps